Husking Bee are a Japanese powerpop/punk band formed in 1994.

According to Oricon, HUSKING BEE’s member were Isobe Masafumi (on Vocals), Kudo "Tekkin" Tetsuya(on Bass) and Hiramoto Leona (on Drums). They debuted in 1995 by "NOT SUPERSTITIOUS III". Hirabayashi Kazuya, today the lead singer and guitarist to the band Fine Lines, joined as a new member in 2000. Despite having many Japanese young fans, they dissolved without explaining the reasons behind their decision on 6 March 2005.

The band reunited in February 2012.

Discography

 GRIP (1996)
 Put on Fresh Paint (1999)
 The Sun and the Moon EP (2000)
 FOUR COLOR PROBLEM (2001), distributed in the US by Doghouse Records
 the steady-state theory (2002)
 variandante (2004)
 ANTHOLOGY [1994~2004] (2005)
 SOMA (2013)
 AMU (2014)
 eye (2020)

In other media
 Hirabayashi Kazuya provided the singing voice for the Koyuki Tanaka character, in the anime adaptation of BECK. The band also contributed the song "Brightest" to the series' second original soundtrack.

External links
 The old HUSKING BEE official website - By Ini Co.
 HUSKING BEE official website
 Keikaku Profile | Husking Bee
 Profile by Toy's Factory

References

Japanese punk rock groups
Toy's Factory artists
Doghouse Records artists